Lesbian, gay, bisexual, and transgender (LGBT) persons in Montenegro face legal challenges not experienced by non-LGBT residents. Both male and female same-sex sexual activity are legal in Montenegro, but households headed by same-sex couples are not eligible for the same legal protections available to opposite-sex married couples.

Same-sex couples are unable to marry, and the Constitution of Montenegro bans same-sex marriage, but since 15 July 2021 same-sex couples may register their relationship as a Life Partnership, which gives them almost the same legal rights and protections available to opposite-sex married couples, except adoption.

Discrimination on the basis of both sexual orientation and gender identity is banned in employment, the provision of goods and services, education and health services. Montenegro also possesses hate crime and hate speech laws which include sexual orientation and gender identity as grounds of non-discrimination. The association ILGA-Europe has ranked Montenegro 8th out of 49 European countries in terms of LGBT rights legislation. Despite this, Montenegrin society has yet to reach a high level of acceptance, and discrimination against LGBT people often goes unreported.

Legality of same-sex sexual activity
Montenegro decriminalised same-sex sexual activity in 1977. The age of consent (14) was also equalised in 1977.

Recognition of same-sex relationships

The Constitution of Montenegro bans same-sex marriage.

On 13 November 2012, then Deputy Prime Minister Duško Marković stated that the Montenegrin Government would prepare a bill giving some form of legal recognition to same-sex couples. The Human and Minority Rights Ministry drafted a bill to legalise registered partnerships, which would confer some of the rights, benefits and responsibilities of marriage but would not include adoption or fostering rights. The Serbian Orthodox Church and the Democratic Front came out in opposition to the proposal, claiming it would "wreck" Christian values and family life in Montenegro. On 27 December 2018, the Government of Montenegro accepted the draft. If enacted, it would have taken effect one year later. The bill was lodged in the Parliament on 24 January. On 27 February 2019, it was backed by the parliamentary committee on human rights. However, on 31 July 2019 the bill was blocked by parliamentarians, led by the Democratic Front, in a 38–4 vote and 39 abstentions. The necessary majority of 41 votes was not achieved. The Democratic Party of Socialists, the Social Democrats and the Liberal Party supported the measure.

On 12 December 2019, the Government approved the second, similar draft of the bill. It was introduced to the parliament on 14 January 2020. On 18 June 2020, the bill was backed by the parliamentary committee on human rights. On 1 July 2020, the bill was approved by the Parliament, in a 42–5 vote and 34 abstentions. The bill was supported by the Democratic Party of Socialists, Social Democrats, Social Democratic Party (except for one deputy), Liberal Party and one deputy from DEMOS. It was opposed by the opposition, as well as three parties representing ethnic minority communities (Croats, Bosniaks, and Albanians). The bill was signed into law on 3 July 2020 by President Milo Đukanović. The law was published on 7 July 2020 in the Official Gazette of Montenegro. It would enter into force on the eighth day from the day of its publication and applied from one year thereafter.

Discrimination protections
On 27 July 2010, the Montenegrin Parliament passed a non-discrimination law that includes sexual orientation and gender identity as prohibited grounds of discrimination. This was one of the requirements the country had to meet for European Union membership. The legislation, known as the Law on Prohibition of Discrimination, defines "discrimination" as follows:

In 2013, the Criminal Code was amended to prohibit hate speech on the basis of both sexual orientation and gender identity, and to provide penalty enhancements if a crime is committed based on the victim's LGBT status. These changes came into force on 3 June 2014.

Military service 

Gays, lesbians and bisexuals are not banned from military service.

Gender identity and expression
Transgender people in Montenegro are allowed to change legal gender, but require undergoing sex reassignment surgery, sterilization, divorce if married and receiving a medical diagnosis to do so.

Social conditions
Gays and lesbians may face discrimination and harassment in Montenegro. Anti-gay attitudes are deeply ingrained in society and there is widespread opposition to LGBT rights. Balkan Insight noted that despite the passage of the civil partnerships bill, previous polling had suggested that 71% of Montenegro's citizens considered homosexuality to be an "illness", and about half thought it was a danger to society that should be suppressed by the state.

LGBT activism
The gay scene is very small. The first Gay Pride event in Montenegro was held on 24 July 2013 in the coastal town of Budva, organized by the NGO "LGBT Forum Progres", and it subsequently caused various reactions in public. On 20 October 2013, a Pride event took place in the capital city of Podgorica, where violent anti-gay protesters were arrested by police.

In September 2017, the fifth annual Podgorica Gay Pride parade took place without any recorded incident. It was organized by the NGO "Queer Montenegro", and was attended by about 200 people.

Summary table

See also

LGBT rights in Europe
LGBT history in Yugoslavia

References

LGBT rights in Montenegro